Grinda is an island located in the Stockholm archipelago, Sweden. It is located south of Ljusterö, east of Vaxholm and west of Svartsö and Möja.

Grinda is a popular island especially during summer, for campers, tourists and  people travelling the Stockholm archipelago by boat. Most of the island is owned by the non-profit organisation Skärgårdsstiftelsen (Archipelago Foundation), whose purpose is keeping the island's nature and facilities in good condition for outside visitors. The island hosts a tavern, bar and grocery store, and is frequented daily during the summer season by the passenger ferries of Waxholmsbolaget.

External links 

 Grinda island home page (Swedish and English)
 Grinda page at Skärgårdstiftelsen (Swedish and English)

Islands of the Stockholm archipelago